Chen Chun-hui born 8 March 1981, is a Taiwanese baseball player who currently plays for Uni-President Lions of Chinese Professional Baseball League. He currently plays as catcher for the Lions, but saw very little action on the field.

References

1981 births
Living people
Baseball catchers
People from Taitung County
Taiwanese baseball players
Uni-President 7-Eleven Lions players
Uni-President 7-Eleven Lions coaches